Storhamar Idrettslag is a Norwegian multi-sports club based in Hamar. It has sections for ice hockey, team handball, association football and figure skating.

History
It was founded in 1935 as Storhamar AIL, a workers' sports club which was a member of Arbeidernes Idrettsforbund. The district Storhamar was located in the municipality Vang until an expansion of Hamar's city limits in 1946. It was one of four significant clubs in the districts before 1940, and because of their status as a local club, and certain ties to the Communist Party, it declined to merge into a catch-all club after 1945. Fellow workers' sports club Hamar AIL did merge, to form part of Hamarkameratene.

Ice hockey

The ice hockey department was established in 1957, and had the name Storhamar Dragons between 1998 and 2015. It is one of the most successful ice hockey clubs in Norway. The home arenas are CC Amfi and Storhamar ishall.

Handball

The club has two sections for handball, the elite section named Storhamar Håndball Elite and a grassroots section.

The team has played in the highest league since its promotion in 2016, and has won bronze three times (2007/08, 2009/10 and 2011/12).

Former players include Heidi Tjugum, Anja Hammerseng-Edin and Maja Jakobsen.

Football

The men's football team currently plays in the Fourth Division, the fifth tier of Norwegian football.

References

 
Sports teams in Norway
Sports clubs established in 1935
Norwegian handball clubs
Football clubs in Norway
Sport in Hamar
Arbeidernes Idrettsforbund
1935 establishments in Norway
Figure skating clubs in Norway
Defunct athletics clubs in Norway